Fredrickson is a surname. Notable people with the name include:

Barbara Fredrickson (born 1964), the Kenan Distinguished Professor of Psychology at the University of North Carolina at Chapel Hill
Dennis Frederickson (born 1939), American politician and farmer, served in the Minnesota Senate
Dennis C. Frederickson (1931–2017), American politician and businessman, served in the Minnesota House of Representatives
Donald S. Fredrickson (1924–2002), American medical researcher, director of National Institutes of Health and Howard Hughes Medical Institute
Frank Fredrickson (1895–1979), Canadian ice hockey centre
George M. Fredrickson (1934–2008), the Edgar E. Robinson Professor of U.S. History at Stanford University from 1984 to 2002
Rob Fredrickson (born 1971), former American football linebacker
Scott Fredrickson (born 1967), Major League Baseball right-handed pitcher
Steve Fredrickson, founder and CEO of the company "PRA Group"
Tyler Fredrickson (born 1981), American football placekicker in the National Football League

See also
Frederiksen
Fredriksson